M.U.K., the Melbourne Ukulele Kollective was formed in March 2004 by Dean 'Dino Divo' Denham to provide a vehicle for the large number of ukulele players that reside in Melbourne, both amateur and professional, to perform and exchange ukulele related information, tunes and technique. MUK also establishes links with schools and community groups and conducts regular ukulele workshops in both playing and making of ukuleles.

The Kollective holds monthly “Open MUK” gigs, at which uke’ers can get up and have a play, swap tunes, and meet others.

The Kollective has hosted the Melbourne Ukulele Festival (MUF) and the associated Pimp My M.U.F. a decorative display of custom painted and decorated ukuleles. Now in its fourth year, the Festival centres on the fair City of Darebin in Melbourne's north. The 2014 festival runs from March 7-9. 

 M.U.K Melbourne Ukulele Kollective
 Melbourne Ukulele Festival
 Melbourne Ukulele Festival on Facebook
 Melbourne Ukulele Kollective on MySpace

Notable Performances

2005
 Port Fairy Folk Festival
 Darebin Music Feast
 Brunswick Festival
 Friends of the Earth Annual Ball

2006
 Brunswick Music Festival
 Moomba Parade
 ABC-TV's Spicks and Specks

2008
 St Kilda Festival
 Adelaide Fringe Festival
 The Evenings program with Derek Guille on 774 ABC Melbourne and ABC Victoria
 The Famous Spiegeltent (22 October)

2010
 Melbourne Ukulele Festival 2010
 Darebin Music Feast - 'Anarchy in the MUK'

2011
 Melbourne Ukulele Festival 2011
 Brunswick Music Festival
 Ballarat Show

2012
 Melbourne Ukulele Festival 2012
 The Famous Spiegeltent

Awards
 Best Family Show for Melbourne Fringe 2004

Music Styles
 Old School Hawaiian
 Jazz
 Show tunes
 Vaudeville
 Blues
 Country
 Punk/Riot
 Trance
 Experimental
 Deconstructionist

External links
 M.U.K Melbourne Ukulele Kollective
 Flea Market Music Inc - player and group directory
 Ukulele Land - Australian Ukulele News

Organisations based in Victoria (Australia)